Gareth (Gary) "Gaz"/"Gazza"/"Lang" Langley (born 24 October 1984) is an English former professional rugby league footballer who played for the Salford City Reds and St. Helens in the Super League before moving on to Oldham. He made one first-grade appearance in St Helens' 26-22 defeat away to the Catalans Dragons in the 2006 Super League XI, a game in which Saints rested several of their regular first-team squad in preparation for their 2006 Challenge Cup Final with the Huddersfield Giants. In this game, he scored one try and kicked three goals. He moved to Oldham in 2006.

References

External links
Saints Heritage Society profile

1984 births
Living people
English rugby league players
Oldham R.L.F.C. players
Rugby league wingers
Salford Red Devils players
St Helens R.F.C. players